The Story of Us with Morgan Freeman is a documentary series televised on the National Geographic Channel in 2017. It is hosted and narrated by actor Morgan Freeman. Produced by Revelations Entertainment, the series examines some of the fundamental forces that drive humanity including love, freedom, peace, factionalism, power and rebellion. The thesis of the series is that people have more in common with each other than what divides them. Six episodes in total, the show airs in an hour long format for a total of six hours (including commercials).

National Geographic approved the series in April 2017 and the first episode aired on October 11, 2017 at 9 pm EDT (8 pm central time)

Episodes

Home media

References

External links
Official Website

2010s American documentary television series
2017 American television series debuts
National Geographic (American TV channel) original programming